Dafydd ap Llewelyn, in the Welsh language, means "David, son of Llewelyn", and there have been several notable people known by this patronymic, including

Dafydd ap Llywelyn (1215–1246), Prince of Gwynedd and first Prince of Wales
Dafydd Gam (1380–1415), Welsh soldier and nobleman who died at the Battle of Agincourt

See also
David Llewellyn (disambiguation)
 Llywelyn ap Dafydd ( – 1287), de jure Prince of Gwynedd 1283–1287